Rheum (from Greek: ῥεῦμα rheuma 'a flowing, rheum') is a thin mucus naturally discharged from the eyes, nose, or mouth, often during sleep (cf. mucopurulent discharge). Rheum dries and gathers as a crust in the corners of the eyes or the mouth, on the eyelids, or under the nose. It is formed by a combination of mucus (in the case of the eyes, consisting of mucin discharged from the cornea or the conjunctiva), nasal mucus, blood cells, skin cells, or dust.

Rheum from the eyes is particularly common. Dried rheum near the eyes is commonly called 'sleep', 'sleepy-seeds', 'sleepy buds', 'sleepy bugs', 'sleepy sand',  'sleepy winks', 'eye boogers', 'Sandman's sand', 'eye goop', 'sleepy dust', 'sleepies', 'eye gunk', 'eye crust', 'sleepy men', 'crusties', 'dozy dust', or 'sleepy dirt'. When the individual is awake, blinking of the eyelid causes rheum to be washed away with tears via the nasolacrimal duct. The absence of this action during sleep, however, results in a small amount of dry rheum accumulating in corners of the eye. A parent or pet owner may notice the collection of rheum on children and pets they care for.

Medical conditions 
A number of conditions can increase the production of rheum in the eye.  In the case of allergic conjunctivitis, the buildup of rheum can be considerable, preventing the patient from opening one or both of the eyes upon waking without prior cleansing of the eye area. The presence of pus in an instance of heavy rheum buildup can indicate dry eye or conjunctivitis, among other infections.

See also 
 Mucopurulent discharge

References

External links

 Eye Discharge
 Why Is There Gunk in My Eye? at WebMD

Body fluids
Ophthalmology
Symptoms